Roslyn Gentle billed as Ros Gentle and Roz Gentle,  is an Australian actress, best known for her role in the television series Prisoner as librarian/prostitute Laura Gardiner/Brandy Carter – an inmate who suffers from multiple personality disorder – in 1983.

She also played Anna Rossi, romantic interest for Jim Robinson, in the 1985 season of Neighbours and acted in two episodes of situation comedy Mother and Son, as Wendy, the girlfriend of Arthur Beare (Garry McDonald), whose mother Maggie (Ruth Cracknell) tries to drive off. Most recently she played "The Demon" juror in The People v. O. J. Simpson: American Crime Story.

Filmography

External links
 

Australian television actresses
Living people
Year of birth missing (living people)